HFC Haarlem was a Dutch football club from the city of Haarlem, established in 1889 and dissolved in 2010. The club won the Eredivisie in 1946 and reached five Cup finals, winning in 1902 and 1912. Haarlem reached the second round of the 1982–83 UEFA Cup, losing to Spartak Moscow of the Soviet Union.

Haarlem was declared bankrupt on 25 January 2010, and excluded from professional football with immediate effect. Haarlem played its last professional match on 22 January 2010, a 3–0 away loss to Excelsior.

In April 2010, three months after its exclusion from professional football, HFC Haarlem completed a fusion with amateur Tweede Klasse club HFC Kennemerland, the new club being named Haarlem Kennemerland. The team played in Tweede Klasse A Saturday Division, West District I in its debut season.

History

The club was founded on 1 October 1889. Haarlem won the Dutch national title in 1946 and reached five Dutch cup finals, winning in 1902 and 1912 and losing in 1911, 1914 and 1950. Haarlem won the title in the Eerste Divisie in 1972, 1976 and 1981. In 1982, HFC Haarlem, featuring a young Ruud Gullit, qualified for UEFA Cup football, in which they were eliminated by Spartak Moscow in the second round (the match hosted by Spartak is known in Russia because of the Luzhniki disaster that occurred in the stadium after the game). In 1990, Haarlem was relegated to the Eerste Divisie again, in which they played until 25 January 2010.

Ajax partnership
On 10 August 2009, Haarlem and AFC Ajax announced a partnership. They decided Ajax would loan 1 to 4 players to Haarlem every season, it also meant Ajax would get a say in Haarlem-transfers, and would deploy employees to Haarlem, Cock Jol, brother of Martin Jol supervised the Ajax-Haarlem project.

Bankruptcy
On 25 January 2010, however, Haarlem was declared bankrupt and was thus according to Dutch league rules excluded from competition, with all its previous results in the ongoing competition expunged. The club in its current form ceased to exist, with all its players (and staff) becoming free agents.

In February 2010, HFC Haarlem was reinstated as a new amateur club, who also took the naming and logo rights from the old version. This club then started talks for a potential merger with amateur Tweede Klasse Haarlem-based side HFC Kennemerland, which was announced to have been completed on 27 April; the new club would be called Haarlem Kennemerland, and would play home games at Haarlem Stadion, thus continuing the legacy of the old HFC Haarlem.

Honours
 Eredivisie
 Winner: 1946
 KNVB Cup
 Winner: 1902, 1912
 Runners-up: 1911, 1914, 1950
 Eerste Divisie
 Winner: 1972, 1976, 1981
 Tweede Divisie
 Winner: 1961, 1963, 1967
 Promoted to Eredivisie
 Promotion: 1969

1982–83 UEFA Cup

Results

Former players

  Bert Aipassa
  Bernard Quainoo
  Ron van Niekerk
  Ruud Gullit

Player records

Historical list of coaches
This is the list of coaches of HFC Haarlem:

 Kick Smit (1951-1956)
 Wim Roosen (1956-1957)
 Ben Peeters (1957-1959)
 Karel Kaufman (1959-1962)
 Ruud van Wilsum (1962-1965)
 Kick Smit (1965-1966)
 Piet Peeman (1966-1967)
 Barry Hughes (1968-1970)
 Bill Thompson (1970-1971)
 Joop Brand (1971-1973)
 Barry Hughes (1973-1980)
 Hans van Doorneveld (1980-1987)
 Dick Advocaat (1987-1989)
 Hans Eijkenbroek (1989-1990)
 Ted Immers (1990-1991)
 Hans van Doorneveld (1991-1994)
 Henny Lee (1994-1995)
 Ben Hendriks (1995-1997)
 Karel Bonsink (1997-2000)
 Heini Otto (2000-2002)
 Leo van Veen (2002-2003)
 Roy Wesseling (2003-2005)
 Gert Aandewiel (2005-2007)
 Jan Zoutman (2007-2009)
 Hennie Spijkerman (2009-2010)

References

External links
 Official website

 
History of Haarlem
Football clubs in Haarlem
Defunct football clubs in the Netherlands
Association football clubs established in 1889
Association football clubs disestablished in 2010
1889 establishments in the Netherlands
2010 disestablishments in the Netherlands